James G. Marshall (–1891) was a farmer, teacher, court clerk, and state legislator in Mississippi. He represented Holmes County, Mississippi in the Mississippi House of Representatives in 1878 and 1879. In 1885 he was recommended for the position of minister to Liberia in Monrovia. He was described as "well educated, intelligent, good looking and well behaved."

See also
 African-American officeholders during and following the Reconstruction era

References

African-American state legislators in Mississippi
Members of the Mississippi House of Representatives
African-American politicians during the Reconstruction Era
1850s births
1891 deaths
Year of birth uncertain
African-American farmers
People from Holmes County, Mississippi
African-American educators
Farmers from Mississippi
19th-century American educators
Educators from Mississippi